Hurricane Isaac was a deadly and destructive tropical cyclone that came ashore in the U.S. state of Louisiana during August 2012. The ninth named storm and fourth hurricane of the annual hurricane season, Isaac originated from a tropical wave that moved off the west coast of Africa on August 16. Tracking generally west, a broad area of low pressure developed along the wave axis the next day, and the disturbance developed into a tropical depression early on August 21 while several hundred miles east of the Lesser Antilles. The system intensified into a tropical storm shortly thereafter, but high wind shear initially prevented much change in strength.

Isaac tracked between Guadeloupe and Dominica late on August 22, and then turned towards the west-northwest and entered a region favorable for intensification; it passed over Haiti and Cuba at strong tropical storm strength. A ridge of high pressure to Isaac's north intensified and turned it westward over the Florida Keys by August 26, and Isaac entered the eastern Gulf of Mexico the next day. The system gradually weakened once inland, but still produced a widespread tornado outbreak across the middle of the country before dissipating into an open low early on September 1.

Before it became a hurricane, Isaac produced flooding rain across much of the Lesser and Greater Antilles. Particularly hard hit was the island of Haiti, where 24 people lost their lives. Overflowing rivers led to significant structural damage and many roadways were washed away, preventing aid to the affected area. Gusty winds and rainfall were reported in Cuba, but damage was limited to a few buildings. In Florida, Isaac produced several inches of rain, leading to flooding. Strong winds knocked out power to thousands, and waves along the coast caused minor beach erosion. The most severe effects of the storm, however, occurred in Louisiana after the storm was upgraded to hurricane intensity.

Tropical storm-force sustained winds, with gusts well over hurricane strength, knocked out power to hundreds of thousands, and heavy rain led to flooding. Many dams along the coast were briefly over-topped, though they did not break completely and were later pumped to prevent failure. As an extratropical cyclone, Isaac produced torrential rains across Arkansas, flooding numerous streets and homes, and damaging many crops across the region. Strong winds felled downed lines and trees. Overall, Isaac caused $3.11 billion (2012 USD) in damage and led to 41 fatalities. Despite the damage, the name was not retired.

Meteorological history

A tropical wave crossed the west coast of Africa between August 15 and August 16. Later that day and early on August 17, the system began developing more convection, while located just west of Sierra Leone. As a result, the National Hurricane Center (NHC) began monitoring the system in the Tropical Weather Outlooks (TWOs). Thereafter, further organization briefly halted, though by early on August 18, associated convection became more concentrated. On the following day, the wave had a "high" probability of undergoing tropical cyclogenesis. Between early on August 19 and early on August 21, minimal structural improvement occurred, despite increases in development probability. Conditions were generally favorable for further intensification, except for northeasterly wind shear.

Despite its intensification, the storm was disorganized with its center north of the deepest convection. The circulation became elongated early on August 22, and the storm absorbed drier air in its northeast quadrant. Later that day, the low pressure area passed just south of Guadeloupe and into the Caribbean Sea. Dry air continued to hinder convection, although Isaac gradually became better organized. By late on August 24, the Hurricane Hunters observed a well-defined circulation; by that time, however, the strongest convection was moving over Hispaniola. An eye feature developed early on August 25, and Isaac attained winds of  before crossing the southwest peninsula of Haiti.

While moving across Haiti, the circulation of Isaac became disrupted while the convection became disorganized. Continuing to the northwest, the storm moved along the north coast of Cuba. Convection increased over the center by early on August 26, and Isaac re-intensified slightly while entering the Straits of Florida. However, continued dry air prevented the inner core of convection from developing. Hurricane Hunters reported that a ragged eye developed multiple times, but the feature did not persist. The storm tracked northwestward across the Gulf of Mexico due to a subtropical ridge to its north. Although the barometric pressure continued to decrease, Isaac remained a large storm, which contributed to the lack of strengthening. At about 1620 UTC (11:20 a.m.

After further intensification, Isaac made landfall at 2345 UTC (6:45 p.m. The eye moved back over water shortly thereafter, crawling just offshore of southeastern Louisiana (with little change in strength) before Isaac struck Louisiana again just west of Port Fourchon at 0715 UTC (2:15 a.m. CDT) on August 29. Hours after it made landfall, Isaac's eye became less circular and was open on the western side. Around 1900 UTC (2:00 p.m. CDT) on August 29, the hurricane weakened into a tropical storm as it slowly moved through Louisiana. Despite its weakening, Isaac continued to produce strong thunderstorms to the east and southwest of the center. Around 2100 UTC (4:00 p.m. CDT) on August 30, Isaac degenerated into a tropical depression over northern Louisiana.
The Hydrometeorological Prediction Center took over the responsibility on issuing advisories from the NHC at 0300 UTC on August 31. The depression continued generally northeastward over Arkansas and Missouri before transitioning into an extratropical cyclone on September 1 as it interacted with an upper-level trough. The remnants of Isaac continued generally eastward over southern Illinois before moving southward over Kentucky. On September 3, the mid-level circulation of the storm split into two parts, with one portion continuing southward into the Gulf of Mexico and the other eastward over Ohio.

Preparations

Lesser Antilles

Upon the issuance of the National Hurricane Center's first advisory for Tropical Depression Nine early on August 21, numerous islands across the Lesser Antilles were placed under hurricane watches or tropical storm warnings. By the end of the day, tropical storm warnings were in place for was issued for Anguilla, Antigua, Barbuda, the British Virgin Islands, Culebra, Dominica, Guadeloupe, Desirade, Les Saintes, Marie Galante, Martinique, Montserrat, Nevis, Puerto Rico, Saba, St. Eustatius, St. Maarten, St. Martin, St. Kitts, United States Virgin Islands, and Vieques. Hurricanes watches were also in place for Puerto Rico, Vieques, Culebra, and the United States Virgin Islands. As the storm continued westward towards the region, a hurricane watch was issued for the British Virgin Islands on August 22. Later that day, Isaac entered the eastern Caribbean Sea as a minimal tropical storm rather than a hurricane, resulting in the discontinuation of all previously issued hurricane watches. As the storm gradually moved further westward into the Caribbean, warnings were discontinued for the various islands, with all warnings ceasing by the end of August 23.

Greater Antilles and The Bahamas
At 0900 UTC on August 22, the government of the Dominican Republic issued a tropical storm watch along the north coast of the Dominican Republic, from the border with Haiti eastward to Saona Island. Simultaneously, a hurricane watch was put into place on the south coast, also extending from the Haitian border to Saona Island. At Guantanamo Bay Naval Base, a trial for five prisoners, who allegedly planned the September 11 attacks, was postponed.

At 1030 UTC on August 24, the government of Jamaica issued a tropical storm watch for the entire island of Jamaica. Early on the following day, the Cayman Islands Meteorological Service designated the Cayman Islands under a tropical storm watch. Several hours later on August 25, the tropical storm watches for both Jamaica and the Cayman Islands were discontinued.

Gulf of Mexico
Oil production in the Gulf of Mexico was down by 24% percent and gas off by 8%, as several major companies (including BP and Shell) evacuated their installations in the east part of the basin. Overall, at least 39 (7%) of 596 production platforms and eight (11%) of 76 Gulf oil rigs were evacuated in the Gulf on August 26. By the evening of August 27, approximately 78% of the Gulf's crude oil production and 48% of its natural gas production had been closed.

United States

Florida

At 2100 UTC on August 24, a tropical storm watch was issued for all of Florida south of the Jupiter Inlet on the east coast and south of Bonita Springs; it also included Lake Okeechobee and the Florida Keys. Early on the next day, the tropical storm watch was upgraded to a warning, while the Florida Keys and the mainland from Ocean Reef to Bonita Springs were now under a hurricane watch. Further north, a tropical storm watch was issued from the Jupiter Inlet to the Sebastian Inlet. Later on August 25, the hurricane watch was switched to a warning, while a separate hurricane watch was issued from Golden Beach southward.

Isaac also posed a threat to the 2012 Republican National Convention (RNC), which was held in Tampa, Florida during the week of August 27, 2012. According to the Republican National Convention spokesman James Davis, officials have been coordinating with the United States Secret Service, should the 50,000 politicians, delegates, and reporters require evacuation. The Republican National Convention was pushed to August 28, 2012, with the storms threatening the coast of Tampa. On August 25, the chairman of the RNC Reince Priebus announced the convention would only convene for a short amount of time on August 27 and "immediately recess until Tuesday afternoon, August 28". At the same time, Governor Scott announced he will not be attending the convention, together with Alabama governor Robert J. Bentley.

Orange juice prices also increased due to the threat of the storm in Florida, which produces more than 75% of orange crops in the United States. On August 25, Florida Governor Rick Scott declared a state of emergency for the state of Florida ahead of Tropical Storm Isaac.  Amtrak suspended the Silver Meteor and Silver Star train service from Orlando to Miami on Sunday, August 26. In the Florida Keys, officials canceled airplane flights and bus routes. The port at Key West was closed during the storm, as were all parks and beaches in the Keys. Emergency shelters were opened, and daily garbage pickup was canceled.

Louisiana

Louisiana Governor Bobby Jindal declared a state of emergency for Louisiana on August 26. Later that day, reports of exposed levees in Louisiana began surfacing from local news outlets. Crews were reportedly dispatched to cover the exposed dirt with heavy plastic and fill gaps in the levees with Hesco bastions. A mandatory evacuation was ordered for St. Charles Parish and for the east bank of Plaquemines Parish and in Lafourche Parish below the Leon Theriot floodgates in Golden Meadow.  4,000 National Guard troops were activated in the state. The closure of all schools and Universities in South East Louisiana, including Louisiana State University followed Gov. Jindal's State of Emergency declaration. Governor Jindal announced that he would not attend the 2012 Republican National Convention and would remain in his state to take care of storm-related problems. On August 27, President Obama ordered federal aid to Louisiana to supplement state and local response efforts due to the emergency conditions resulting from Tropical Storm Isaac beginning on August 26, 2012. Governor Jindal on August 27 sent a letter to the Obama administration that the declaration fell short of the help he was requesting.
Gov. Jindal had temporarily suspended Louisiana's licensing requirements for emergency medical technicians, to let medical assistance officials from other states help Louisiana respond to Hurricane Isaac. Louisiana Commissioner of Administration Paul Rainwater announced that all state government offices would be closed August 29.
The US Army Corps of Engineers closed the Seabrook Floodgate and the IHNC Lake Borgne Surge Barrier to protect the New Orleans area from a storm surge.

Mississippi
Mississippi Governor Phil Bryant declared a state of emergency the evening of August 26, 2012 The governor ordered mandatory evacuations to begin at 8 a.m. CT (9 a.m. ET) on August 27 for residents along the coast and in some low-lying areas inland.
On August 27, the Jackson County Board of Supervisors ordered a mandatory evacuation of all areas south of U.S. Route 90. It included all areas south of US 90 in Ocean Springs, Mississippi, Gautier, Mississippi and Pascagoula, Mississippi. The evacuation was in effect as of 4pm CT. 
Officials dispatched 1,500 National Guard troops to the state's three southern counties, as well as 45 state troopers to ease traffic flow.
On August 28, the president signed an emergency declaration for the state of Mississippi.

Alabama
Alabama Governor Robert J. Bentley declared a state of emergency ahead of Isaac. Mandatory evacuations for Baldwin and Mobile counties beginning at 8:00 a.m. on August 27 for zones one and two. Governor Bentley soon announced that he would not be attending the 2012 Republican National Convention, and will remain in his state to take care of storm-related problems.
On August 28, Governor Bentley lifted the mandatory evacuation orders covering southern Baldwin and Mobile counties and issued voluntary orders for areas vulnerable to Isaac's expected impact.

Impact

Lesser Antilles

In Martinique, a meteorologist reported at least  of rain. One indirect fatality occurred in Puerto Rico after a 75-year-old woman fell from a second-floor balcony in Bayamón while preparing for the storm. In Naguabo, minor coastal flooding had resulted in at least one road closure. Scattered to widespread power outages were also confirmed throughout Puerto Rico. Damage across Puerto Rico amounted to $3,000.

Venezuela
Isaac did not directly impact Venezuela, but the storm's outer bands produced heavy rains over part of the country. In the state of Sucre, the Manzanares River overflowed its banks in the town of Cumanacoa, flooding approximately 1,200 homes, many of which were damaged and a few destroyed. Some residents had to be airlifted to safety. Similar flooding occurred elsewhere in the country, such as in Caracas where 40 families had to be evacuated. Across Caracas, transportation was significantly disrupted as the local Metro suspended service and debris blocked local roads. The most significant flooding in the city occurred in western areas where hundreds of families had to be evacuated. In the state of Monagas, heavy rains and high winds damaged a total of 47 homes. Several roads were blocked by downed trees and flooding, temporarily isolating a few cities. Across the states of Anzoátegui, Monagas, and Sucre, 3,200 families were affected by the floods and 600 homes were damaged or destroyed. In the state of Yaracuy, flooding destroyed 10 homes and affected 70 others. At least two people were killed and two others were listed as missing in various events related to the storm.

Greater Antilles
Authorities estimated at least 30,000 residents were evacuated across the island of Hispaniola.

Haiti
Isaac swept across Haiti's southern peninsula, bringing flooding and storms in areas affected by the January 2010 earthquake. A woman and a child died in the town of Souvenance, and a 10-year-old girl died in Thomazeau when a wall fell on her. A seven-year-old boy was electrocuted in the city of Gonaives. As many as 5,000 people were evacuated because of flooding, as scores of tents in quake settlement camps collapsed and at least 300 houses were flooded in the Port-au-Prince shantytown of Cité Soleil. Doctors Without Borders announced it anticipated a spike in cholera cases due to flooding and it was preparing to receive more patients. President Michel Martelly canceled his trip to Japan to coordinate emergency response efforts and visit residents with Prime Minister Laurent Lamothe. On August 26, 2012, the Haitian government announced that at least 14,000 people had left their homes, while another 13,500 were living in emergency shelters. According to official figures, at least a dozen houses were destroyed and 269 damaged during the storm. On August 28, the death toll in Haiti was revised up to at least 24, with three others missing. News reports in the area stated up to 29 deaths, however.

Agricultural losses across the country amounted to $242 million. Damage to the nation's electrical infrastructure reached 336 million gourdes (US$7.9 million).

Dominican Republic

Authorities in the Dominican Republic evacuated nearly 7,800 people from low-lying areas, and at least 10 rural settlements were cut off by flooding. Parts of Santo Domingo lost electricity during the height of the storm. At least five fatalities were reported, including three men who drowned in flooded rivers, and 49 homes were destroyed throughout the country. Agricultural losses across the country were estimated to be at least $30 million.

Cuba
In Baracoa, the electricity was cut off as a preventive measure, and at least two houses were destroyed by flooding. Authorities announced 230 people were in emergency shelters.

United States

As of 12 P.M. (CDT) Thursday, August 30, power companies said more than 900,000 customers were without power in Louisiana, Mississippi, Alabama, Florida, Texas and Arkansas. 34 tornadoes touched down across the Southeast from August 27 to September 4 and Isaac (and later its remnants) moved across that part of the country.

Florida

The storm dropped heavy rain in the Treasure Coast and West Palm Beach area in Florida, with many areas reporting at least  and an estimated peak total of  near the center of the county. Winds left at least 16,900 customers in Palm Beach County without electricity.  In Tequesta, wind gusts were estimated to have reached . Additionally, winds in the area blew significant amounts of sand away, exposing rocks and created  drops. Slightly further south, waves of  pounded the beaches of Jupiter. Only minimal beach erosion was reported, but hundreds of sea turtle nests were swept away. A man died in West Palm Beach after driving through the storm and crashing into a concrete wall along Interstate 95, and another man doing the same thing died in a crash on State Road 78. Damage in Palm Beach County totaled $71.59 million.

On August 27, an EF0 tornado touched down in Indian River County for about two minutes, damaging 95 houses. Heavy rainfall from Isaac spread up the Florida coast, with  reported in Vero Beach.

As part of the Public Advisory issued at 10:00 PM CDT on August 30, the National Hurricane Center reported cumulative rainfall totals (up through 7:00 PM CDT) resulting from Isaac's impact. Losses in Escambia and Santa Rosa Counties amounted to $10.4 million and $1.2 million respectively.

Louisiana

While Isaac was moving ashore Louisiana, it produced a high storm surge that reached  in Shell Beach. As of Wednesday afternoon (Aug. 29), over 600,000 customers were reported without power in Louisiana, mainly in Metropolitan New Orleans. Flooding was reported in Slidell, Louisiana, as pumping stations were unable to keep up with rainfall rates. On the morning of August 30, Tangipahoa Parish officials issued a mandatory evacuation for those living on or near the Tangipahoa River from Kentwood to Robert after Lake Tangipahoa Dam at Percy Quin State Park near McComb, Mississippi sustained heavy damage. At the time, McComb Mayor Whitney Rodgers said there was a 50% chance the dam would fail. The dam held, and after the storm water was pumped over the dam to lower the lake levels and begin repairs. St. John the Baptist Parish was one of the hardest hit areas. A lack of a hurricane levee system and 8–10 ft storm surge caused massive flooding of hundreds of homes. Over 3500 residents were rescued and evacuated.

A 36-year-old man was killed in Vermilion Parish when he fell 18 feet from a tree while helping friends move a vehicle before the storm. After an initial rescue of 115 survivors from flooded homes in Braithwaite on the east bank of Plaquemines Parish on August 29, 2 bodies were discovered the next day floating in the kitchen of a flooded home, after a rescued evacuee in a shelter informed authorities of additional missing people. Authorities announced at least two others died in the state due to the storm, including a 75-year-old man who drowned after his car drove off a flooded highway near Slidell, and another man who died in a restaurant fire. Altogether, at least 901,000 homes lost electricity during the passage of Isaac in Louisiana, which accounts for 47% of the state's energy users. By August 31 these were down to less than 600,000 as emergency crews began operations across the region, although authorities warned it would be "days" until power was restored to everyone.
By September 1, more than 400,000 customers in the state remained without power.
Hurricane Isaac damaged nearly 59,000 homes across southeast Louisiana, which is four times more than previously estimated.

Mississippi
A  storm surge was reported in Hancock County on August 28. Wind gusts reached  in Gulfport. Three adults and one infant in Mississippi were rescued overnight from a houseboat. There are about 2,132 evacuees housed in 31 shelters across the state and about 4,000 homes were without power as of 5:30 a.m. CT. A man was crushed in the cab of his tow truck in Picayune, Mississippi after a tree fell on it, while he was on a call to assist a stranded motorist. A 62-year-old woman died in similar circumstances on August 30. The National Weather Service reported that  of rain had fallen at Kiln, Mississippi through 7:00 PM CDT on August 30;  was recorded at Gulfport.
The excessive rain from Isaac also eroded the Lake Tangipahoa Dam at Percy Quin State Park, causing it to nearly break and flood the already-high Tangipahoa River.

Alabama
 of rain was recorded at Mobile Regional Airport through Wednesday, Aug. 29. Coastal flooding was reported in several towns in Mobile and Baldwin Counties including Bayou la Batre, Gulf Shores and Orange Beach. Hurricane Isaac uncovered the shipwreck of The Rachael—an early 20th-century vessel that ran aground in Gulf Shores, Alabama. 
According to the Alabama Historical Commission, the ship is believed to have run into rough waters while carrying timber in 1930.

Arkansas
In Arkansas, damages from the remnants of Hurricane Isaac totaled to at least $30.504 million statewide. Although no deaths were reported, three people were injured in Arkansas. Heavy rainfall from the storm complex caused flooding throughout the state. In Pine Bluff, Arkansas, numerous streets and homes were flooded, along with other structures. In addition, schools in the region, most notably the University of Arkansas at Pine Bluff, were forced to closed early due to the storm. Schools in other areas of Arkansas were also forced to close early. Other areas of the state encountered flash flooding after slow-moving rainbands dropped heavy rains in localized areas. While the rainfalls benefited hay crops and pastures, rice crops were heavily damaged, and cotton, corn, and soybean crops suffered relatively minor damage. As a result of the rainfall, several rivers in the state experienced flooding. The worst river flooding impacts were felt in Brooklyn, Arkansas, where the nearby Black Creek caused damage to 15 homes near its banks after overflowing. Despite the rainfall, Isaac's remnants did not lessen the ongoing drought conditions in Arkansas.

Strong winds from Isaac's remnants blew down power poles in Arkansas County, amounting to $4,000 in damages. Strong winds also felled numerous trees. Fallen tree branches were also responsible for taking down power lines. Downed power lines and other electrical issues caused by Isaac resulted in a power outage for more than 20,000 electricity customers in Arkansas.

See also

Tropical cyclones in 2012
Other storms of the same name
List of Category 1 Atlantic hurricanes
Hurricane Ike (2008) – A deadly Category 4 hurricane that caused widespread destruction across the Caribbean
Tropical Storm Lee (2011) – A storm that impacted similar areas
Tropical Storm Cindy (2017) – A storm that impacted similar areas
Hurricane Barry (2019) – A minimal hurricane that caused widespread flooding across Louisiana and Arkansas
Hurricane Laura (2020) – A Category 4 hurricane that took a similar path through the Caribbean into Louisiana, causing widespread damage and dozens of fatalities

References

External links

 Hurricane Isaac Advisory Archive – National Hurricane Center
 Crisiswiki: Hurricane Isaac
 Radar animations of Hurricane Isaac (courtesy: Brian McNoldy, RSMAS/Univ of Miami)
 601st Air Operations Center Facebook Page
 601st Air Operations Center Twitter Page
 Latest humanitarian response information via ReliefWeb

 
2012 Atlantic hurricane season
2012 natural disasters in the United States
Isaac (2012)
Category 1 Atlantic hurricanes
2012 in the Caribbean
Hurricanes in the Leeward Islands
Hurricanes in the Windward Islands
Hurricanes in Guadeloupe
Hurricanes in Îles des Saintes
Hurricanes in Haiti
Hurricanes in Louisiana
Hurricanes in Florida
Hurricanes in Alabama
Hurricanes in Mississippi
Articles containing video clips
August 2012 events in the United States
September 2012 events in the United States
Isaac
Hurricanes in Oklahoma
Hurricanes in Kansas